A national shrine is a Catholic church or other sacred place which has met certain requirements and is given this honor by the national episcopal conference to recognize the church's special cultural, historical, and religious significance.

Process
For a church to receive the status of a national shrine involves a number of steps and certifications. It must first be designated as a diocesan (or archdiocesan) shrine, an honor conferred by the local bishop or archbishop.  To be designated as a diocesan shrine, the subject church must be a place "to which numerous members of the faithful make pilgrimage for a special reason of piety." It must exceed other churches in terms of worship, Christian formation, and social services. When these requirements are met, the parish petitions the bishop to canonically elevate the church.
 
When devotion has grown, the diocesan shrine may petition the national Conference of Catholic Bishops.  Evaluation by the nation's bishops involves considerations including canon law, liturgy, and doctrine. 

Declaration of an international shrine is conferred by the Holy See.

International shrines
 Basilica of the Assumption, Aglona, Latvia
 Basilica della Santa Casa, Loreto, Italy
 Pontifical Basilica of Saint Anthony of Padua (Basilica Pontificia di Sant'Antonio di Padova), Padua, Italy
 Sanctuary Basilica of Our Lady of the Rosary (Fátima), Fátima, Portugal
 Basilica of the National Shrine of Our Lady of Knock, Knock, Ireland
 Sanctuary Shrine of Divine Mercy, Kraków, Poland
 International Shrine of Our Lady of Peace and Good Voyage, Antipolo, Philippines
 Shrine of Our Lady of Sorrows, Stary Wielisław, Poland
 St. Thomas International Shrine, Malayattoor, India
 Sanctuary of Our Lady of Lourdes (Sanctuaire de Notre-Dame de Lourdes), Lourdes, France
 , recognized on 14 September 2018
 , Seosan, South Korea; recognized on 29 November 2020
International Sanctuary of Jesus the Saviour and Mother Mary, Elele, Nigeria

National shrines listed by country 
There are 230 national shrines in the world, as well as eleven international shrines.

Africa
There are four national shrines in Africa.

Democratic Republic of Congo 
National Shine of Blessed Marie-Cleméntine Anuarite (Sanctuaire National Bienheureuse Anuarite), Isiro

Kenya 
National Shrine of Our Lady of Africa, Village of Mary Mother of God, Subukia

Nigeria 
National Shrine of Our Mother of Perpetual Help, Ugwogwo-Nike (Enugu)

Uganda 
Basilica of the Uganda Martyrs, Namugongo

Asia
There are 46 national shrines in Asia.

China
National Shrine Basilica of Our Lady Mary Help of Christians, Sheshan (Shanghai)
National Shrine of Our Lady of China, Chiayi

East Timor

India
National Shrine Cathedral Basilica of Saint Thomas, Chennai
National Shrine Basilica of Our Lady of Ransom, Vallarpadam
Saint Thomas Mount National Shrine, Chennai

Japan
National Shrine of the Twenty-Six Martyrs of Japan, Nagasaki

Lebanon
Shrine of Our Lady of Lebanon (مزار سيدة لبنان; Sanctuaire Notre-Dame-du-Liban), Harissa

Pakistan
 National Marian Shrine, Mariamabad

Philippines (26)

Luzon
Basilica of Our Lady of Peñafrancia, Naga
 , Quezon City
Basilica of San Lorenzo Ruiz, Binondo 
 National Shrine of La Virgen Divina Pastora, Gapan
 National Shrine of Mary Help of Christians, Parañaque
National Shrine of Our Lady of Fatima, Valenzuela 
 National Shrine of Our Lady of Guadalupe, Makati
 National Shrine of Our Lady of La Salette, Silang 
National Shrine of Our Lady of Lourdes, Quezon City
 National Shrine of Our Lady of Sorrows, Dolores 
National Shrine of Our Lady of the Abandoned, Manila
National Shrine of Our Lady of the Holy Rosary of La Naval de Manila, Quezon City
 National Shrine of Our Lady of the Miraculous Medal, Muntinlupa 
National Shrine of Our Lady of the Visitation, Gamu 
National Shrine of Our Mother of Perpetual Help, Parañaque
National Shrine of Saint Anne, Hagonoy 
National Shrine of Saint Anthony of Padua, Pila
National Shrine of Saint Jude, Manila
National Shrine of Saint Michael and the Archangels, Manila
National Shrine of Saint Padre Pio, Santo Tomas
National Shrine of the Divine Mercy, Marilao 
 National Shrine of the Sacred Heart, Makati
National Shrine of Our Lady of Salambao, Obando

Visayas
National Shrine of Our Lady of the Candles (Metropolitan Cathedral of Saint Elizabeth of Hungary), Iloilo 
 National Shrine of Saint Joseph, Mandaue

South Korea
  at Jeoldu-san, Seoul

Sri Lanka
 National Shrine of the Holy Cross, Marawila
 Basilica of Our Lady of Lanka, Tewatta, Colombo
 Shrine of Our Lady of Madhu, Madhu
 National Shrine of St. Anne, Kalpitiya
 National Shrine of St. Anne, Kattimahana, Udubaddawa
 St. Anthony's Shrine, Kochchikade, Colombo

Taiwan
 Wanchin Basilica of the Immaculate Conception, Wanluan
 National Shrine of Our Lady of China, Meishan, Chiayi

Vietnam
Basilica of Our Lady of La Vang (Ðền thơ Đức Mẹ La Vang), La Vang

Europe
There are 34 national shrines in Europe.

Albania
 Sanctuary of Our Lady of Good Counsel, Shkodra

Austria
Basilica of the Birth of Mary (Basilika Mariä Geburt), Mariazell

Belarus
Basilica of Our Lady of the Assumption, Budslau

Belgium
Basilica of the Sacred Heart (Basilique Nationale du Sacré-Cœur), Koekelberg

Bulgaria
 , Plovdiv

Croatia
 , Karlovac
  of Saint Nicolas Tavelic, Šibenik

Czech Republic
 Cathedral of Saints Vitus, Wenceslaus and Adalbert (Katedrála sv. Víta, Václava a Vojtěcha), Prague

France
 Basilica of Our Lady of the Immaculate Conception (Basilique Notre-Dame de l'Immaculée-Conception), Lourdes
  (Sanctuaire national Notre-Dame Auxiliatrice), Nice
 Our Lady of Reims Cathedral (Cathédrale Notre-Dame de Reims), Reims

Germany
National Shrine of Our Lady of Altötting (Gnadenkapelle Altötting), Altötting

Hungary
  (Görög Katolikus Máriapócs Nemzeti Kegytemplom), Máriapócs

Ireland

National Shrine of Saint Oliver Plunkett, Drogheda

Italy
National Shrine of Mary Mother and Queen, Contovello

Malta
Ta' Pinu Shrine, Għarb

Poland
Archcathedral Basilica of Bishop Saint Stanislaus and Martyr and Saint Wenceslaus (Bazylika Archikatedralna św. Stanisława Biskupa i męczennika i św. Wacława), Krakow
Jasna Góra Shrine Basilica of the Black Madonna (Bazylika Jasnogórska Wniebowzięcia NMP), Częstochowa
Basilica of the Immaculate Omni-mediatress of All Glories of Niepokalanów (Bazylika NMP Niepokalanej Wszechpośredniczki Łask w Niepokalanowie), Teresin
Sanctuary of Saint Jadwiga, Trzebnica

Portugal
National Shrine of Christ the King (Santuário Nacional de Cristo Rei), Almada
  (Santuário Nacional de Nossa Senhora da Conceição), Vila Viçosa

Slovakia
  (Bazilika Sedembolestnej Panny Márie), Šaštín

Slovenia
  (Bazilika Marije Pomagaj), Brezje

Spain
Royal Basilica of Our Lady of Atocha, Madrid
Basilica of Mary of God of Montserrat (Basílica de la Mare de Déu de Montserrat), Montserrat
  (Santuario Nacional de la Gran Promesa), Valladolid

United Kingdom 
England
National Shrine & Basilica of Our Lady of Walsingham, Little Walsingham
National Shrine of Our Lady of Willesden, London
National Shrine of Saint Jude, Faversham
National Shrine to St. Joseph (Saint Michael's Abbey), Farnborough

Scotland
Metropolitan Cathedral of Our Lady of the Assumption, Edinburgh
National Shrine of Our Lady of Lourdes, Carfin

Wales
Welsh National Shrine of Our Lady of the Taper, Cardigan

Gibraltar
National Shrine of Our Lady of Europe

North America
There are 101 national shrines in North America.

Canada
Basilica of Saint Ann of Beaupré (Basilique Sainte-Anne-de-Beaupré), Sainte-Anne-de-Beaupré
National Shrine of Canadian Martyrs, Midland
National Shrine of Our Mother of Perpetual Help, Toronto
National Shrine of the Little Flower, Wakaw
Our Lady of the Cape Basilica (Basilique Notre-Dame-du-Cap), Cap-de-la-Madeleine
Saint Anthony's Hermitage (Ermitage Saint-Antoine), Lac-Bouchette
Saint John the Baptist Ukrainian Catholic National Shrine, Ottawa
Saint Joseph's Oratory of Mount Royal (Oratoire Saint-Joseph du Mont-Royal), Montreal

Caribbean
Cuba
National Shrine of Jesus of Nazareth of Ransom (Santuario Nacional de Jesús Nazareno del Rescate), Havana
National Shrine Basilica of Our Lady of Charity of El Cobre (Basílica Santuario Nacional de Nuestra Señora de la Caridad del Cobre), El Cobre
National Shrine of Saint Barbara (Santuario Nacional de Santa Bárbara), Havana
Our Lady of Regla National Shrine (Santuario Nacional Nuestra Señora de Regla), Havana
Saint Lazarus National Shrine (Santuario Nacional San Lázaro), Havana
Dominican Republic
Our Lady of La Altagracia Cathedral Basilica (Basílica Catedral Nuestra Señora de la Altagracia), Higüey
Our Lady of Mercies National Shrine (Santuario Nacional Nuestra Señora de las Mercedes), La Vega
Holy Christ of Miracles National Shrine (Santuario Nacional Santo Cristo de los Milagros), Santo Domingo
Haiti
National Shrine of Our Lady of Perpetual Help (Sanctuaire Nationale de Notre-Dame du Perpetuel Secours), Port-au-Prince

Central America
Costa Rica
Holy Christ of Esquipulas National Shrine (Santuario Nacional Santo Cristo de Esquipulas), San José
Holy Christ of Esquipulas Shrine (Santuario Santo Cristo de Esquipulas), Santa Cruz
El Salvador
Queen of Peace Basilica Cathedral (Catedral Basílica Reina de la Paz), San Miguel
Guatemala
Basilica of Our Lady of the Rosary (Basílica de Nuestra Señora del Rosario), Guatemala City
Church of Saint Francis the Great (Iglesia de San Francisco el Grande), Guatemala City
Basilica of the Black Christ of Esquipulas (Basílica del Cristo Negro de Esquipulas), Esquipulas
Honduras
Basilica of Our Lady of Suyapa (Basílica de Nuestra Señora de Suyapa), Tegucigalpa
Nicaragua
National Shrine of Our Lady of Cuapa (Santuario Nacional Nuestra Señora de Cuapa), Cuapa
National Shrine Basilica of Our Lady of the Immaculate Conception (Santuario Nacional Basílica de Nuestra Señora de la Inmaculada Concepción), El Viejo
Panama
National Shrine of the Immaculate Heart of Mary (Santuario Nacional del Corazón de María), Panama City

Mexico
Distinguished and National Basilica of Saint Mary of Guadalupe (Insigne y Nacional Basílica de Santa María de Guadalupe), Mexico City
Old Basilica of Our Lady of Guadalupe (Antigua Basílica de Nuestra Señora de Guadalupe), Mexico City

United States
There are 72 national shrines in the United States.

Alaska
National Shrine of Saint Thérèse, Juneau
California
National Shrine of Our Lady of Guadalupe (Santuario Nacional de Nuestra Señora de Guadalupe), Sacramento
National Shrine of Saint Francis of Assisi, San Francisco
Mission Basilica and National Shrine of Saint John of Capestrano (Misión Basílica San Juan Capistrano), San Juan Capistrano
District of Columbia
Basilica of the National Shrine of the Immaculate Conception (Basílica del Santuario Nacional de la Inmaculada Concepción), Washington, D.C.
Saint John Paul II National Shrine, Washington, D.C.
Ukrainian National Shrine of the Holy Family, Washington, D.C.
Florida
Hermitage of Charity of El Cobre (Ermita de la Caridad del Cobre), Miami
Basilica of the National Shrine of Mary Queen of the Universe, Orlando
National Shrine of Our Lady of La Leche, St. Augustine
Illinois
National Shrine of Mary Immaculate Queen of the Universe, Lombard
National Shrine of Our Lady of the Snows, Belleville
National Shrine of Saint Ann, Chicago
National Shrine of Saint Frances Xavier Cabrini, Chicago
National Shrine of Saint Jude, Chicago
National Shrine of Saint Maximilian Kolbe, Libertyville
National Shrine of Saint Peregrine (Our Lady of Sorrow Basilica), Chicago
National Shrine of Saint Thérèse, Darien
National Shrine of the Poor Souls, Berwyn
Indiana
National Shrine of Our Lady of Providence, Saint Mary-of-the-Woods
Louisiana
National Shrine of Blessed Francis Xavier Seelos, New Orleans
National Shrine of Saint Ann, Metairie
National Votive Shrine of Our Lady of Prompt Succor, New Orleans
Maryland
National Shrine Basilica of Saint Elizabeth Ann Seton, Emmitsburg
Basilica of the National Shrine of the Assumption of the Blessed Virgin Mary, Baltimore
National Shrine Grotto of Our Lady of Lourdes, Emmitsburg
National Shrine of Saint Alphonsus Liguori, Baltimore
Massachusetts
Madonna Queen of the Universe National Shrine, Boston
National Shrine of the Divine Mercy, Stockbridge
National Shrine of Our Lady of La Salette, Attleboro
Michigan
National Shrine of the Cross in the Woods, Indian River
National Shrine of the Little Flower Basilica, Royal Oak
Minnesota
National Shrine of Saint Odilia, Onamia
National Shrine Cathedral of the Apostle Paul, Saint Paul
Missouri
National Shrine of Mary Mother of the Church, Laurie
National Shrine of Our Lady of the Miraculous Medal, Perryville
New Jersey
National Shrine of Jesus of Great Power (Santuario Nacional de Jesús del Gran Poder), Newark
National Shrine of Our Lady of the Highway, Little Falls
National Shrine of Saint Gerard, Newark
New York
National Shrine Basilica of Our Lady of Fatima, Lewiston
National Shrine of Mary Help of Christians, Stony Point
 National Shrine of Our Lady of Martyrs, Auriesville
 National Shrine of Our Lady of Mount Carmel, Middletown
National Shrine of Saint Gennaro, New York City
National Shrine of Saint Kateri Tekakwitha, Fonda
National Shrine of Saint Vincent Ferrer, New York City
National Shrine of the Little Flower of Jesus, Buffalo
Our Lady of Victory Basilica and National Shrine, Lackawanna
Saint Ann's Armenian Shrine Cathedral, Brooklyn
Ohio
Basilica and National Shrine of Our Lady of Consolation, Carey
Basilica and National Shrine of Our Lady of Lebanon, North Jackson
National Shrine of Our Lady of Lourdes, Euclid
National Shrine of Saint Anthony, Cincinnati
National Shrine of Saint Dymphna, Massillon
National Shrine of the Holy Relics, Maria Stein
Oklahoma
National Shrine of the Infant Jesus of Prague, Prague
Oregon
National Sanctuary of Our Sorrowful Mother, Portland
Pennsylvania
National Shrine of Our Lady of Guadalupe Mother of the Americas, Allentown
National Shrine of Our Lady of Czestochowa, Doylestown
Basilica of the National Shrine of Saint Ann, Scranton
National Shrine of Saint John Neumann, Philadelphia
National Shrine of Saint Rita of Cascia, Philadelphia
Puerto Rico
Metropolitan Cathedral Basilica of Saint John the Baptist (Catedral Metropolitana Basílica de San Juan Bautista), San Juan Antiguo
National Shrine of Our Lady Mother of Divine Providence (Santuario Nacional de Nuestra Señora Madre de la Divina Providencia), Cupey
Tennessee
National Shrine of Saint Martin de Porres, Memphis
Texas
Basilica of the National Shrine of Our Lady of San Juan del Valle, San Juan
Basilica of the National Shrine of the Little Flower, San Antonio
Virginia
National Shrine of Our Lady of Walsingham, Williamsburg
Wisconsin
Basilica of Our Lady Mary Help of Christians at Holy Hill, Hubertus
National Shrine of Our Lady of Good Help, Champion
National Shrine of Saint Joseph, De Pere

Oceania
There are five national shrines in Oceania.

Australia 
 , Middle Park, Victoria
 National Shrine of Saint Anthony, Hawthorn, Victoria
 National Shrine of Saint Thérèse of Lisieux, Kew, Victoria
 Saint Mary's Cathedral, Sydney

New Zealand 
 St Mary of the Angels, Wellington

South America
There are 35 national shrines in South America.

Argentina
 National Basilica of Our Lady of Luján (Basílica Nacional de Nuestra Señora de Luján), Luján, Buenos Aires
  (Santuario Nacional de Schoenstatt), Florencio Varela, Buenos Aires
  (Basílica Santuario de Santa Rosa de Lima), Buenos Aires

Brazil
 National Shrine Basilica Cathedral of Our Lady of the Conception Revealed (Catedral Basílica Santuário Nacional de Nossa Senhora da Conceição Aparecida), Aparecida
  (Santuário Nacional de Nossa Senhora de Loreto ), Rio de Janeiro
 , Anchieta, Espírito Santo
 National Shrine of the Holy Head (Santuário Nacional de Santa Cabeça), Cachoeira Paulista
 National Shrine of the Sacred Heart of Jesus (Santuário Nacional do Sagrado Coração de Jesus), Itu, São Paulo
  (Basílica Santuário de Nossa Senhora da Penha), Rio de Janeiro

Chile
National Sanctuary of Maipú (Santuario Nacional or Templo Votivo de Maipú), Maipú, Santiago

Colombia
  (Santuario Nacional de Nuestra Señora del Carmen), Bogotá
  (Basílica de Nuestra Señora del Rosario de Chiquinquirá), Chiquinquirá
 National Shrine Basilica of Our Lady of Las Lajas (Basílica Santuario Nacional de Nuestra Señora de Las Lajas), Las Lajas

Ecuador
  (Santuario Nacional de Nuestra Señora María Natividad del Guayco), La Magdalena
  (Santuario Nacional de Nuestra Señora del Cisne), El Cisne
  (Santuario Nacional de Nuestra Señora de la Gruta de La Paz), La Paz
  (Santuario Nacional de Nuestra Señora de la Presentación del Quinche), El Quinche
  (Santuario Nacional de la Divina Misericordia), Guayaquil
 Basílica del Voto Nacional a.k.a. Sacred Heart of Jesus Patron of Ecuador Basilica (Basílica Sagrado Corazón de Jésus, Patrono del Ecuador), Quito
  (Santuario Nacional Santa Narcisa de Jesús), Nobol

Paraguay
  (Santuario Nacional de Nuestra Señora del Perpetuo Socorro), Asunción
  (Santuario Nacional del Sagrado Corazón de Jesús), Asunción
 Cathedral Basilica of Our Lady of Miracles (Catedral Basílica Nuestra Señora de los Milagros), Caacupé

Peru
Saint Peter's Basilica (Basílica San Pedro), Lima
National Shrine of St. Rosa of Lima (Santuario de Santa Rosa de Lima), Lima

Trinidad and Tobago
 National Shrine of Our Lady of Laventille, Port of Spain
 Shrine of the Rosary, Port of Spain

Uruguay
 Basilica Cathedral and National Shrine of San José de Mayo (Catedral Basílica de San José de Mayo), San José de Mayo
  (Santuario Nacional María Auxiliadora), Montevideo
  (Santuario Nacional de la Gruta de Lourdes), Montevideo
 National Shrine of the Sacred Heart (Santuario Nacional del Sagrado Corazón), Montevideo
 National Shrine of the Virgin of the Thirty-Three at the Basilica Cathedral of Our Lady of Luján (Santuario Nacional de la Virgen de los Treinta y Tres), Florida

Venezuela
Our Lady of Coromoto Cathedral Basilica (Basílica Catedral Nuestra Señora de Coromoto), Guanare
Our Lady of Coromoto National Shrine Basilica (Basílica Santuario Nacional Nuestra Señora de Coromoto), San Genaro de Boconoíto
Shrine Basilica of Santa Capilla (Basílica Santuario de Santa Capilla), Caracas

References

External links
 Catholic Shrines, a listing of all the Catholic shrines in the United States

Catholic pilgrimage sites